Ülle is an Estonian feminine given name, a feminine form of the masculine given name Ülo.

People named Ülle include:
Ülle Aaskivi (1950–2007), politician
Ülle Jaakma born 1957), agronomist, veterinarian and university rector
Ülle Kaljuste (born 1957), actress
Ülle Kukk (born 1937), botanist and conservationist
Ülle Lichtfeldt (born 1970), actress
Ülle Madise (born 1974), lawyer and current Chancellor of Justice 
Ülle Rajasalu (born 1953), politician
Ülle Toming (born 1955), dancer and actress
Ülle Ulla (1934–2016), ballet dancer, actress, dance teacher and opera singer
Kauksi Ülle (born 1962 as Ülle Kahusk), poet

Estonian feminine given names